This is a list of fire departments in California.

California fire departments

Alameda County
  Alameda County Fire Department
Amador County
  Amador County Volunteer Protection District
Orange County,California 
  Anaheim Fire & Rescue
South 
  Bakersfield Fire Department
North
  Bennett Valley Fire Protection District
  Borrego Springs Fire Protection District
  Brea Fire Department
  CALFIRE/Butte County Fire Department (Volunteer)
  CAL FIRE
  Colton FIRE
  CDF Aviation Management Program
  Cathedral City Fire Department
Southern Los Angeles - San Diego 
  Chula Vista Fire Department
  Compton City Fire Department
  Costa Mesa Fire & Rescue Department
  El Cerrito Fire Department
  Escondido Fire Department 
  Escalon Consolidated Fire Protection District 
  FIRESCOPE
  Fremont Fire Department
  Fresno Fire Department
  Idyllwild Fire Protection District
  Hemet Fire Department
  Humboldt Bay Fire
Huntington Beach Fire Department
  Kern County Fire Department
  Livermore - Pleasanton Fire Department
  Long Beach Fire Department
  Los Angeles Fire Department
  Los Angeles County Fire Department
  Merced Fire Department
  Lockwood Valley Fire Protection District
  Lodi Fire Department San Francisco Bay Area 
  Milpitas Fire Department
  Murrieta Fire & Rescue
  Modesto Fire Department
  Oakland Fire Department
  Orange County Fire Authority
  Ontario Fire Department
  Palm Springs Fire Department
  Rattlesnake Mountain Volunteer Fire Department Oak Springs Ca
  Riverside Fire Department
  Rialto Fire Department
  Rancho Cucamonga Fire Department 
  Sacramento Fire Department
  Sacramento County Fire Department
  San Bernardino County Fire Department
  San Diego Fire Department
  San Diego County Fire Department
  San Francisco Fire Department
  San Jose Fire Department
  San Ramon Valley Fire Protection District
  Santa Clara County Fire Department 
  Santa Cruz Fire Department
  Santa Cruz County Fire Department 
  Santa Muerte Fire Department
  Soboba Fire Department
  Stockton Fire Department
  Woodside Fire Protection District
  Ventura County Fire Department

References

 
Fire departments